Non-retroactivity is the legal principle that laws do not apply retroactively, whether international laws such as treaties or in criminal law (opposing ex post facto law).

References

Law